is a passenger railway station in the city of Sōsa, Chiba Japan, operated by the East Japan Railway Company (JR East).

Lines
Shiosai limited express services stop at this station.

Station layout

Yōkaichiba Station has a two opposed side platforms, connected by a footbridge. The station has a "Midori no Madoguchi" staffed ticket office.

Platforms

History
Yōkaichiba Station opened on 1 June 1897 as a station on the Sōbu Railway for both passenger and freight operations. On 1 September 1907, the Sōbu Railway was nationalised, becoming part of the Japanese Government Railway (JGR). On 5 December 1926, the Chiba Prefectural Railway Tako Line also started operations to this station. (Later renamed the Narita Railway Tako Line, services were discontinued on 11 January 1944, and the line abolished in 1946). After World War II, the JGR became the Japanese National Railways (JNR). Scheduled freight operations were suspended from 1 October 1974. The station was absorbed into the JR East network upon the privatization of JNR on 1 April 1987. The north exit plaza was renovated in 1989, and a new bus terminal completed in 1995.

Passenger statistics
In fiscal 2019, the station was used by an average of 1762 passengers daily (boarding passengers only).

Surrounding area
 Sōsa City Office
 Sōsa Police Station
 Keiai University Yōkaichiba High School
 Chiba Prefectural Sōsa High School

See also
 List of railway stations in Japan

References

External links

 JR East station information 

Railway stations in Japan opened in 1897
Railway stations in Chiba Prefecture
Sōbu Main Line
Sōsa